Giovanbattista Venditti (born 27 March 1990) is a retired Italian rugby union player for of Italian national rugby union team. He represented Italy on 44 occasions and he normally played as a wing. In January 2012 he was called up to the Italian team for the 2012 Six Nations Championship. 
He made his Italian debut against France on 4 February 2012. He scored his first try for Italy in his second game against England.

Venditti played for Aironi from 2010 to 2012 and Zebre from 2012 to 2020 with exception for 2016-16 when he signed for Newcastle Falcons .

References

External links

1990 births
Living people
Italian rugby union players
Italy international rugby union players
Zebre Parma players
Aironi players
Rugby union wings
Sportspeople from the Province of L'Aquila